Monster High: Escape from Skull Shores is a 2012 CGI-animated adventure fantasy television film special produced by Nerd Corps Entertainment and released on 12 February 2012 on Nickelodeon in the United States.

It is the 4th television/film special based on the Monster High doll line by Mattel and it is tied to its dedicated Skull Shores line, which was released separately from the production. Universal Pictures released it alongside Monster High: Fright On on 1 July 2014 as part of a branded Monster High: Clawesome Double Feature Blu-ray release.

Plot

For spring break, Lagoona invites her friends to come with her to the Great Scarrier Reef. On the way the ship is attacked by a kraken and sinks, leaving the group stuck on a small raft.  Nearby are two humans; Bartleby Farnum, an eccentric show-and salesman and his assistant Kipling, who covers his face with a sack because he is too horrible to look at. Farnum hears the young monsters shouting and, planning to exhibit them,  saves them. Frankie resembles an explorer who had a particular attachment to a creature Farnum has wanted to capture for a long time, the Beast of Skull Shores, so he plans to use Frankie as bait.

Farnum takes the monsters to Skull Shores, claiming he has to pick up supplies before going to Great Scarrier Reef. Once docked, the group is welcomed by the local population, the Tiki.  Farnum convinces them to keep the group entertained so that he can work out a trap for the beast.

Suspicious, Lagoona and Gil sneak aboard Farnums boat to find out what Farnum's up to, and find a recording of the beast and the explorer who befriended him. They surmise that Farnum plans to use Frankie as bait to capture the beast.  
Farnum reveals the existence of the beast to the students and how an explorer was able to soothe it. Frankie's chair suddenly rises in the air and Farnum elaborates that the Tiki gave the explorer to the beast to keep him from attacking them. Clawdeen demands that performance ends because it's starting to become scary, but only a moment later the beast appears, lured by the drums of the Tiki. The students are shocked and Frankie is very afraid in her vulnerable position, especially after the beast grabs her, until she notices that the beast means her no harm. Farnum and the Tiki launch their attack, throwing spears at the beast but the spears are not enough to harm the beast. After a few seconds, the beast marches off with Frankie. The Tiki people force Ghoulia and Abbey into a pitfall trap, while Clawdeen, Draculaura, and Cleo escape. Farnum splits up the Tiki in two groups: one that will remain in the village and keep guard, and one that will follow the beast's trail as well as the tracking device in Frankie's necklace with Farnum. Lagoona and Gil return shortly afterwards to find that they are too late. The couple set off to save Frankie on their own.

The next morning when Frankie awakens  a shy, friendly boy is with her. She asks who he is, then remembers the monster and tells him they should flee while it is gone. The boy answers that won't be necessary, as the beast and he are the same creature. He introduces himself as Andy, and explains that he was born some centuries ago with and that he changes into a huge beast if he experiences hate, anger, or fear, whether his own or another's. Due to this, his family had to move often. Eventually he reached Skull Shores in search of a place to live in peace. 
Meanwhile, Clawdeen, Cleo, and Draculaura are following the trail of the beast. Back In the village, Ghoulia and Abbey trick the remaining Tiki down the pit, at which point Abbey freezes them, allowing the girls to use the Tiki as stairs to escape. . Abbey admonishes the Tiki for imprisoning her and Ghoulia, as well as for any bad deed they carried out by the order of Farnum, and the Tiki beg for forgiveness. Abbey accepts their apologies and the Tiki join forces with the students to stop Farnum. In the jungle, Lagoona and Gil are spying on Farnum  and realize he has a tracking device planted on Frankie.. On Farnum's orders, Kipling captures Lagoona. Gil runs off, leaving Lagoona and Farnum certain he's acting on cowardice. As Farnum mocks Lagoona and Gil, Lagoona sympathizes with the timid Kipling, seeing that he isn't anything like his cruel master, and tries to encourage him to not be ashamed of whatever facial flaws he's hiding under the sack despite what people like Farnum tell him time and time again, since it's the only way he can break free from Farnum's influence. Kipling declines, certain he can rely on his master.

Frankie asks Andy about the statues on the island. Andy tells that an explorer made the statues after she left, so as to be reminded of her whenever he felt upset. Suddenly, the duo notices movement in the bushes and Andy, thinking it's Farnum or his minions, charges in to attack, only to find the surprised trio of Clawdeen, Draculaura, and Cleo. Any joy about the reunion is squashed mere moments later, when Farnum is spotted. Andy runs away but doesn't make it far before he has to hide and subsequently overhears the entire exchange between the students and Farnum. Though Farnum initially has the upper hand, Abbey and Ghoulia make their entrance. The Tiki who sided with Abbey and Ghoulia convince the Tiki with Farnum to turn on him. Only mildly bothered, Farnum takes his special cane and makes a magnet appear, which pulls Frankie to him. Threatening to suck the electricity from her with the magnet, Farnum shouts for the beast to appear. Andy, outraged that Farnum would go to great lengths just to get to him, changes into his giant form, only to find that he can't do anything but comply with Farnum's orders, lest he risks Frankie's very life as well as everyone else's safety. He changes back and turns himself in. Farnum is delighted about the beast's dual nature and how that makes him much more manageable than he had thought the beast would be.

Back at Farnum's boat, Farnum forces Andy to get in the boat as the ghouls helplessly watch. However, the group is surprised to see Gil rise from the water, backed up by a small army of dolphins as well as the kraken that destroyed the students' boat. This time, the kraken destroys Farnum's boat, then picks up Farnum and flings him into the jungle. Kipling runs after his master, despite Lagoona's plea for him to stay. With the threat gone, Gil explains that he ran and swam off to the Great Scarrier Reef to ask Lagoona's parents for help. They talked to the kraken, who felt sorry for what it had done and not only agreed to save Lagoona and co., but also to fix the boat it had destroyed. Lagoona is overjoyed about the courage and reliability Gil showed her and also happy that he finally stopped being scared of her parents and her home. The students resume their journey, taking Andy with them.

At a distance, Farnum and Kipling watch the students, who've forgotten about Frankie's necklace, leave. Farnum swears this isn't the end of the matter.

With Spring Break over, the ghouls try to make Andy feel at home at Monster High, which turns out to be more work than initially thought. Due to Andy's long-time isolation, he is unfamiliar with 21st century technology. At one point, Headless Headmistress Bloodgood makes an announcement over the intercom, prompting Andy to believe there's someone stuck in 'that box', which he rips from the wall. The students and teachers take it in stride though, laughing about Andy's antics. Andy starts feeling welcomed, yet remains doubtful that the others would like him if they knew about his true nature.

After some days, Headless Headmistress Bloodgood orders everyone to the auditorium for a speech about tolerance by a human guest speaker. While the human appears merely eccentric at first, he starts calling the students "specimens" and "oddities" and appears particularly intent on tormenting Andy. An enraged Bloodgood demands that he leave, as his speech has nothing to do with tolerance. The man joyously explains he didn't mean to lecture about tolerance, but about intolerance. Pestering Andy further, he is slammed away by the boy, and the man's disguise falls off, exposing him as Farnum. Several students try to fight Farnum, but Farnum is too quick and witty for them.

Andy, pushed by the chaos, transforms and bursts through the roof, sending the other students and teachers fleeing for their lives as the ceiling comes down on them. Frankie tries in vain to calm Andy, who picks her up and climbs one of Monster High's towers to escape the chaos with her. Farnum and Kipling, however, show up on the bridge between the towers and Farnum tells Andy that, just as with Kipling, a freak like him has nowhere else to turn to than to a man like Farnum. Though Andy agrees with Farnum's reasoning and again turns himself in, Frankie convinces him that while he has his issues, he belongs at Monster High. Kipling, finally fed up with Farnum's abuse and realizing that Frankie is right, takes off his hood, revealing that his ears are shaped like an elephant's, and stands up to Farnum before he picks him up and throws him into a tar pit. During his fall, Farnum crosses paths with a flock of birds, causing him to end up not only tarred, but feathered too. The humans Farnum had called to take Andy into custody mistake Farnum for the beast (due to his freaky look with tar and feathers) and capture him.

Although he finally broke ties with Farnum, Kipling is still unsure whether he'll be accepted until he spots two monster girls who have elephant ears too and clearly think he's a looker. The happy end seems to be gone with that when Headless Headmistress Bloodgood announces she has grave news. Due to the damages done to the school, Spring Break is extended with a week to get reparations done. As Headless Headmistress Bloodgood ends in an upbeat tone of voice, the students cheer. On recommendation by Abbey, the entire student body decides to enjoy the extra vacation on Skull Shores, much to the Tikis' delight too.

Voice cast

 Laura Bailey as Lagoona Blue & Headmistress Bloodgood
 Ogie Banks as Clawd Wolf
 Cam Clarke as Heath Burns & Anonymous Ghost
 Malcolm Danare as Kipling
 Debi Derryberry as Draculaura
 Erin Fitzgerald as Abbey Bominable & Spectra Vondergeist
 Kate Higgins as Frankie Stein
 America Young as Howleen Wolf, Toralei Stripe & Elephant Girl
 Jonathan Lipow as The Tikis
 George Newbern as Andy Beast
 Audu Paden as Ghoulia Yelps, Manny Taur & Nightmare
 Cindy Robinson as Jackson Jekyll/Holt Hyde & Operetta
 Salli Saffioti as Clawdeen Wolf & Cleo de Nile
 Keith Silverstein as Bartleby Farnum
 Evan Smith as Deuce Gorgon, Gil Webber, Mike & Ted

Reception
Grace Montgomery from Common Sense Media offered a parental advisory that the film depicted teens as ghouls, goblins, and ghosts, [but] they are "more silly than sinister," and while the film offers a "strong message about tolerance," the message is "partially undermined by the over-the-top sexy outfits and makeup sported by the female characters, who are otherwise pretty decent role models." They also appraised by it having only "mild references to adult relationships and a little cartoon violence, this short tale should be OK for grade-schoolers and up."  Conclusions included "It's campy and a little cheesy and full of every cringe-worthy joke and pop-culture reference about monsters they could fit in, but there's something endearing about the classmates of Monster High," and summarized "Although it's not to be expected that the ghoulish girls of Monster High would be dressed like your average teen, it's a shame they have to be decked out to the nines. With a little more clothing and a lot less makeup, many of the female characters would be stellar role models, without detracting from the plot."  Enios M. Duarte at Hi-Def Digest gave a review of the TV/film special, claiming that it had him "surprisingly engaged" during its runtime."

Release titles by language
Monster High: La Bête de l'Île au Crâne (French)
Monster High: Kalokairines monster peripeteies (Greek)

References

External links
 

2012 animated films
2012 television films
2012 films
2010s American animated films
Films based on fashion dolls
Films based on Mattel toys
Universal Pictures direct-to-video films
Universal Pictures direct-to-video animated films
Monster High